Göran Axel Ragnerstam (born 7 November 1957 in Stockholm) is a Swedish actor.

Ragnerstam grew up in Södermalm and later in Vällingby. His father was interested in theatre and acted out for his children. He encouraged Ragnerstam to move on to an acting course. Ragnerstam  took part in plays in primary school primary education and secondary school. After that he worked on Posten AB, before he did military service conscription. An ad about training to be an actor got him to study at Kulturama, and after that he studied at NAMA in Malmö 1981–1984. After that he was involved in the Gothenburg City Theatre. Ragnerstam has also worked with Lars Norén.

Ragnerstam is married to Carina Boberg is a cousin of author Bunny Ragnerstam.

Filmography
 2017 - Jordskott II
 2017 - Vår tid är nu
 2016 - A Serious Game
 2015 - Jordskott
 2010 - Tusen gånger starkare
 2009 – Morden
 2007 – Arn – The Knight Templar
 2007 – Isprinsessan
 2006 – Pressure
 2006 – Offside
 2006 – Wallander – Jokern
 2006 – En fråga om liv eller död
 2005 – Kissed by Winter
 2004 – Hotet
 2004 – Graven
 2003 – Norrmalmstorg
 2003 – Kommer du med mig då
 2003 – Kopps
 2002 – Suxxess
 2002 – Pepparrotslandet
 2001 – Bekännelsen
 2000 – To Be Continued
 2000 – Soldater i månsken
 2000 – 
 1999–2001 – Sjätte dagen
 1999 – Offerlamm
 1999 – God jul
 1999 – Vägen ut
 1998 – Pip-Larssons
 1998 – Personkrets 3:1
 1998 – Beck – Öga för öga
 1998 – Skärgårdsdoktorn
 1997 – Svensson Svensson
 1997 – Rika barn leka bäst
 1997 – Solstenen
 1997 – Glappet
 1997 – Emma åklagare
 1996 – Rusar i hans famn
 1996 – En fyra för tre
 1996 – Älskade Lotten
 1996 – Ett sorts Hades
 1995 – Torntuppen
 1995 – En på miljonen
 1994 – Pillertrillaren
 1993 – Hedda Gabler
 1987 – Lysande landing
 1985 – Åshöjdens BK
 1981 – Skål och välkommen

Theatre
 1999 – Skuggpojkarna

References

External links

1957 births
Swedish male actors
Living people
Best Supporting Actor Guldbagge Award winners